Fife Council is the local authority for the Fife area of Scotland and is the third largest Scottish council, with 75 elected council members.

Councillors are generally elected every five years. At the 2012 election there were 78 councillors elected, but this was reduced to 75 by the time of the 2017 election, after a review by the Boundary commission for Scotland. The number of wards was reduced from 23 to 22.

Councillors make decisions at its regular Council meetings, or at those of its nine other general committees (covering for example Tourism and transportation, Education, Environment, Housing, Licensing etc.), two planning committees, and seven area committees.

Following the May 2017 council elections no party was in overall control, resulting in a Power Sharing Agreement being drawn up between the Scottish National Party (SNP) and the Labour group to share control equally. David Alexander (SNP) and David Ross (Labour) were agreed as co-leaders of the council.

A Provost of Fife is elected every five years, who chairs the full council meetings and acts in a ceremonial capacity on behalf of the council. The current Provost is former football manager Jim Leishman MBE, who was first elected in May 2012.

Political composition 
 
Since the May 2017 election there have been several changes to the composition of the council, although the joint SNP-Labour administration has remained.

 Lesley Laird (Labour) resigned in June 2018, replaced by Dave Coleman (Conservative) in a September 2018 by-election.
 Alan Craig (Conservative) resigned in 2019, replaced by Derek Glen (SNP) in a November 2019 by-election.
 Samantha Steele (SNP) resigned in 2019, replaced by Sharon Green Wilson (SNP) in a November 2019 by-election.
 Linda Holt resigned from the Conservatives in December 2019 and now sits as an independent.

The 2017 election saw the Conservatives make significant gains and, while the SNP lost its leader on the council, Neale Hanvey, it ended up as the largest party. The SNP and Labour agreed to govern in coalition, with joint council leaders.

Wards
Buckhaven, Methil and Wemyss Villages
Burntisland, Kinghorn and Western Kirkcaldy
Cowdenbeath
Cupar
Dunfermline Central
Dunfermline North
Dunfermline South
East Neuk and Landward
Glenrothes Central and Thornton
Glenrothes North, Leslie and Markinch
Glenrothes West and Kinglassie
Howe of Fife and Tay Coast
Inverkeithing and Dalgety Bay
Kirkcaldy Central
Kirkcaldy East
Kirkcaldy North
Leven, Kennoway and Largo
Lochgelly, Cardenden and Benarty
Rosyth
St Andrews
Tay Bridgehead
West Fife and Coastal Villages

References

External links
Fife Council web site

Local authorities of Scotland
Politics of Fife
Organisations based in Fife
Glenrothes